Mirko Bašić (born 14 September 1960 in Bjelovar, SFR Yugoslavia) is a former Croatian handball player who competed in the 1984 Summer Olympics and in the 1988 Summer Olympics. He has also played six EHF Champions League finals winning two in 1984–85 and 1985–86 as part of the famous RK Metaloplastika which dominated European handball in the 1980s (often referred to as Handball Aliens).

Bašić was a big influence on Thierry Omeyer who is regarded as the greatest goalkeeper in handball history.

Career
At the age of 16 Bašić debuted for RK Partizan Bjelovar.

In 1984 he was a member of the Yugoslav handball team which won the gold medal. He played all six matches as goalkeeper.
Four years later he was part of the Yugoslav team which won the bronze medal, playing five matches.

In 1985 and 1986 he was a member of European Champions Cup winning team of RK Metaloplastika. With RK Metaloplastika he also won 7 Yugoslav national titles. He also played an additional ECC final with the club and reached three more semi-finals and a Cup Winners' Cup semi-final. Throughout the 1980s Bašić was considered one of the best goalkeepers in the game. In 1989 he left Šabac to go play for Medveščak Zagreb for one season. With club he won the Yugoslav Cup that season.

He moved to the French First League to Vénissieux handball in January 1989, with whom he won the 1991 cup. Then he joined the wealthy emerging OM Vitrolles in 1991 where he won the 1993 Cup Winners' Cup and in the same year was French league for the fourth time in a row. From 1993 to 1996 Bašić was in retirement from handball.

In 1996 he returned to the scene with Badel 1862 Zagreb where he played for five years winning five league and four cup titles also reaching the EHF Champions League final three times. After a season and half in RK Medveščak he ended his career in 2003 at Fotex Veszprém.

Personal life
He is the father of professional handball player Sonja Bašić.

Honours

Player
Partizan Bjelovar
Yugoslav First League (2): 1976–77, 1978–79

Metaloplastika Šabac
Yugoslav First League (7): 1981–82, 1982–83, 1983–84, 1984–85, 1985–86, 1986–87, 1987–88
Yugoslav Cup (3): 1983, 1984, 1986
European Champions Cup (2): 1984–85, 1985–86, finalist (1): 1983–84

Medveščak Zagreb
Yugoslav Cup (1): 1990

Vénissieux
French First League runner's up (2): 1990–91 and 1991–92
Coupe de France (1): 1991

Vitrolles
French First League runner-up (2): 1991–92 and 1992–93
Coupe de France (1): 1993
Cup Winners' Cup (1): 1993, finalist (1): 1994

Badel 1862 Zagreb
Croatian First League (5): 1996–97, 1997–98, 1998–99, 1999–00, 2000–01
Croatian Cup (4): 1997, 1998, 1999, 2000
EHF Champions League finalist (3): 1996–97, 1997–98, 1998–1999

Fotex Veszprém
Hungarian First League (1): 2002–03
Magyar Kupa (1): 2003

Individual

Assistant Coach
RK Zagreb
Croatian First League (7): 2003–04, 2004–05, 2005–06, 2006–07, 2007–08, 2008–09, 2009–10
Croatian Cup (7): 2004, 2005, 2006, 2007, 2008, 2009, 2010
IHF Cup Winners' Cup finalist (1): 2005

References

External links
Olympic database profile
European profile
Croatian Olympic Profile

1960 births
Living people
People from Bosilegrad
Yugoslav male handball players
Croatian male handball players
Handball players at the 1984 Summer Olympics
Handball players at the 1988 Summer Olympics
Olympic handball players of Yugoslavia
Olympic gold medalists for Yugoslavia
Olympic bronze medalists for Yugoslavia
Olympic medalists in handball
RK Zagreb players
Medalists at the 1988 Summer Olympics
Medalists at the 1984 Summer Olympics
Mediterranean Games gold medalists for Yugoslavia
Competitors at the 1983 Mediterranean Games
Competitors at the 1993 Mediterranean Games
Mediterranean Games gold medalists for Croatia
Mediterranean Games medalists in handball